QCL may refer to:

Air Class Líneas Aéreas (ICAO Code: QCL)
Queen's College, London
Queensland Cement and Lime Company, a building material manufacturer in Australia
Quantum cascade laser
Quantum Computation Language